17 let Oktyabrya (Oktjabrəm ija 17 itləs) is a rural locality (a village) in Kirovskoye Rural Settlement of Maykopsky District, Russia. The population was 191 as of 2018.

Streets 
 Pryamaya

Geography 
17 let Oktyabrya is located 18 km north of Tulsky (the district's administrative centre) by road. Mafekhabl is the nearest rural locality.

References 

Rural localities in Maykopsky District